The 2014 Fórmula Truck season was the 19th Fórmula Truck season. It began on March 18 at Caruaru and ended on December 7 at Goiânia. All ten rounds counted towards the Brazilian title, with four rounds counting towards the South American title.

Leandro Totti won his second Fórmula Truck title in three years, after starting the season with five successive victories for the RM Competições team, before adding a sixth victory at the series' only race outside of Brazil, at the Autódromo Oscar Cabalén in Argentina. He finished 44 points clear of his teammate Felipe Giaffone, who was a race winner at Londrina. Third place in the championship went to Wellington Cirino, who piloted his ABF Mercedes to a victory in the season finale, at Goiânia. The season's only other winners were Scuderia Iveco driver Beto Monteiro, who won at Santa Cruz do Sul, while Roberval Andrade won at Guaporé for Corinthians Motorsport. With seven victories from the ten races, MAN Latin America won the manufacturers' championship by over 100 points ahead of the next closest marque, Mercedes-Benz.

Totti and MAN Latin America also won the South American sub-classifications, which was held over four of the first seven races in the 2014 season. Totti won all four races, finishing 61 points clear of Giaffone and Cirino's ABF Mercedes teammate Geraldo Piquet. MAN Latin America also won their respective title by 61 points, ahead of Mercedes-Benz.

Teams and drivers
All drivers were Brazilian-registered.

Calendar and results
All races were held in Brazil, excepting the round at Autódromo Oscar Cabalén, that was held in Argentina.

Key:

References

External links
  

2014 in Brazilian motorsport
2014